The Sunset Handicap was an American Thoroughbred horse race run annually during the third week of July at Hollywood Park Racetrack in inglewood, California. The Grade III event is open to horses, age three and up, willing to race one and one-half miles on turf. With the closure of Hollywood Park at the end of 2013 the Sunset Handicap ceased to exist.

Inaugurated in 1938 as the Aloha Handicap, in 1940 it was renamed the Sunset Handicap. It was raced on dirt until 1967. Since inception it has been contested at various distances:
 9 furlongs : 1938, 1950
 12 furlongs : 1939, 1940, 1967–1968, 1973–present
 13 furlongs : 1941, 1946–1949, 1951–1966
 16 furlongs : 1969-1972

In 1975, the Sunset Handicap was run in two divisions.

On December 2, 2009, this Grade II stakes race was downgraded to a Grade III by the American Graded Stakes Committee.

Historical notes

 In 1976, trainer Charles Whittingham saddled the first three finishers.

Records
Speed  record: (at current distance of  miles)
 2:23.55 - Talloires (1996)

Most wins:
 2 - Whodunit (1959, 1961)

Most wins by a jockey:
 13 - Bill Shoemaker (1956, 1958, 1962, 1964, 1967, 1973, 1974, 1975, 1977, 1978, 1980, 1981, 1987)

Most wins by a trainer:
 11 - Charles Whittingham (1973, 1974, 1976, 1978, 1979, 1980, 1981, 1982, 1983, 1987, 1992)

Winners

Other North American Marathon races
On dirt:
 Gallant Man Handicap
 Brooklyn Handicap
 Fort Harrod Stakes
 Tokyo City Cup
 Valedictory Stakes

On turf:
 Canadian International Stakes
 Carleton F. Burke Handicap
 San Juan Capistrano Invitational Handicap
 Stars and Stripes Handicap
 San Luis Obispo Handicap
 San Luis Rey Handicap

References
 The Sunset Handicap at Pedigree Query
 The 2009 Sunset Handicap at the NTRA

Horse races in California
Hollywood Park Racetrack
Discontinued horse races
Graded stakes races in the United States
Open middle distance horse races
Turf races in the United States
Recurring sporting events established in 1938
Recurring sporting events established in 2013